Fengli (literally 'wind leopard cat') is a legendary or mythified flying mammal of China, whose descriptions from various sources were collated in the Taiping Yulan encyclopedia (10th century ) and the Bencao gangmu (16th century) compendium of materia medica.

It is called fūri by Japanese sources dating back to the Edo period.

Overview 

The beast is described as resembling a dark-colored or blue-green (or greenish yellow and black) animal spotted like a leopard but smaller, about the size of a wildcat (leopard cat) or marten.  Alternate sources say the beast resembles a vanishingly short-tailed monkey, or a rabbit. It is capable of flying or gliding across trees or jutted rocks, eating fruits. Sources say that its alias fengshengshou favors eating spiders.

The fengli  bears a number of other aliases, including fengmu  (Japanese: fūbo, literally "wind mother"), fengshengshou, pinghou ('flat monkey'), etc.

A collated account of the fengli is given in the  Bencao gangmu (1596), under its "Four Legged Animals II" section, but it misstates some alias names and work titles, drawing from such sources as the entry for "fengmu" in the encyclopedia Taiping yulan (c. 980).

The beast is identified the colugo as according to one hypothesis, a palm civet or a slow loris have been suggested by others.

The fengli has a number of lore attached to it. It is said to carry a magical wand, or a broken stalk of grass, which merely by pointing to the prey can cause it to fall from a tree (cf. §hunting wand). It is also said to die easily by striking, but this is feigned death, and it will revive momentarily upon receiving wind upon it. It is supposedly immune to cutting by blade, or burning by fire. But plugging its nose with the sweet flag (root portion) was considered lethal to it. Otherwise, only by rupturing its brain and breaking its bones can it be killed completely.

Its urine purportedly was effective against leprosy, according to the old Chinese pharmacopoeia.

The jiqu, which reputedly ate perfume (Indian frankincense, or mastic) was described as a separate beast in the original source, but has been equated with the fengli by the Bencao gangmu.

Nomenclature 

The beast fengli, literally 'wind leopard cat', is described under that title in the Bencao Gangmu (1782)[1596]. The fengli article was originally a sub-article within the preceding leopard cat article.

Also fengshengshou ('wind-life/birthing-beast'[?]) is given in the [Hainei] Shizhou ji ("Records of the Ten Islands [Within the Sea]"<ref> "Shi zhou ji]", pp. 920–922</ref>)  and the Baopuzi.

And fengxing ( is the name quoted from the Lingnan  yiwu zhi ("Records of Extraordinary Things from Lingnan") in the encyclopedia.

While the beast jiqu (Japanese: kikkutsu) is treated as another alias of fengli by the Bencao gangmu, the jiqu is treated in a separate chapter (Ch. 16) in the original source, and presumably distinct from fengli as far as the source (Youyang zazu) is concerned, placing these in Books/Chapters 16 and 15, respectively The reputation of eating a type of perfume (mastic) is  attributed to the jiqu. It characteristics are rather different and shall be segregated and discussed under §Jiqu below.

 Geographical range 

The fengli was also found in certain western parts of Shu (archaic for Sichuan), in areas called the "outside of Xijao".

 Non-native to Japan 
The fengli (fūri) was not a creature known to be found in Japan so far as  knew, according to his Wakan sansai zue.

 External appearance 

 Size 
The fengli is said to measure about the size of a li (leopard cat) or an otter according to the Bencao gangmu.

The fengshengshou is rather decribed as blue/green leopard-like, but about the size of a xingxing  which is tentatively identified as orangutan, suggesting perhaps a large beast. However, scribal errors seems to be in play, because while xingxing (orangutan-sized) is traceable to Baopuzi as quoted in encyclopedia, the original text reads li ("badger-sized") in the Baopuzi itself.

And there is the alias fengxing, presumably meaning 'wind orangutan', but the beast there is described as being monkey- or ape-like yet small.

 Coat and color 

The creature, described by its different aliases, is likened to several different animals depending on the source.

The amalgamated profile of the fengli according to the Bencao gangmu is that its fur has markings similar to a leopard, and is multicolored, either "blue-green, yellow, and black", or "greenish-yellow and black", depending on the translator. The BCGM also says it is a short-tailed (almost tailess) beast resembling a small ape or monkey, with red eyes.

 Breakdown by source 

The creature fengshengshou is described as blue (or rather green) and leopard-like in two sources quoted by the encyclopedia.

However, one of the two sources quoted secondhand, the Baopuzi, provides quite a different reading when the standalone edited text is consulte. The BPZ actually describes the fengshengshou as a beast that "resembles a diao() [marten or sable].. [which] is dark in color and as big as a li or badger".

As for the simian resemblances, the fengli is said to resemble a hwangyuan or "yellow gibbon" according to the aforementioned  [Guihai] Yuheng zhi ("Treatises.. [of the Cinammon Sea]"), while fengli resembled a ju- monkey), had long eyebrows and tended to shy away, according to the Youyang zazu ("; "a Miscellany from Youyang"). The fengmu beast which bore the alias pinghou or “flat monkey” was monkey-like, hairless, and red-eyed according to the Nanzhou yiwu zhi. The fengli resembles  a rabbit according to one source.

 Behavioral traits 

But the preferred food is also said to be the spider for the  fengmu beast or the fengli.

It is said to curl up like a hedgehog by day, and by night it turns active and agile, or flies in air when the wind rises, or "jump[s] very high with the wind, crossing cliffs and pasing above trees―like birds flying in  the air", as the BCGM sums it up.

 Capture, feigned death, killing method 
The BCGM writes that when the creature encounters a human, they present a shy demeanor, "bend their head and seem to beg for mercy", though an original source words it somewhat differently.

The fengli (fengxing, fengshengshou) will seem to die easily when struck, but resuscitates momentarily upon turning its mouth toward the wind, The fengshengshou is reputedly immune to penetration by blade, and also incombustible when attempted to burn with fire, and can only be completely killed by pulverizing its bones and breaching its brain.

Another piece of lore is that it can also be killed instantly by plugging its nose with the rhizome (root) of the sweet flag (Acorus sp.) particularly the Acorus gramineus species (石菖蒲, "grassleaf sweet flag").{{{Refn|A variant reading states that a sweet flag (Acorus calamus) growing on top of stone should be used (fengshengshou 「風生獣」 in BPZ 《抱朴子・内篇》、'fengshengshou 「風生獣」 in  Shizhouji 《[海内十洲記》).}}

Hunting wand 

According to the lore of southerners, the fengli always carries a small stick or wand which when pointed at renders (the birds or beasts) incapable of flying or running (or immobilizes them When a human obtains this wand, mere pointing at the prey will ensure its capture. But even if the fengli is netted, the wand will not be found (it has discarded the tool). But by caning the fengli a hundred times (or by severely hitting it） the animal will be persuaded to point to the whereabouts of the wand.

Other sources report somewhat differently on the wand. The wand owned by is more difficult to obtain than the yixingcao (tr. as 'grass that covers up [your] body' (a sort of grass of invisibility)) according to the experts of the art of treating wind diseases. This "wand" is actually a piece of grass stalk that the fengli breaks off, measuring a little over 1 chi or Chinese foot (thus not something it carries always), and in order to catch it in action, humans span a length of rope between trees, then conceal themselves in the hollow of a nearby tree. After about three days' wait, the creature will come, and finding a flock of birds gathered in the trees, points at them with the grass-stalk causing them to fall, and starts eating. Humans emerge to capture it, but the fengli typically swallows the grass or flings it away. Thus it is struck several hundred times until it is willing to retrieve the correct grass.

The magic grass of the fūri is  also mentioned in the Edo Period essay , and includes an anecdote that someone who stole the  grass a fūri, tried to catch the bird by climbing a tree, and when he held it out the bird, the bird and that person both fell from the tree.。

Medicinal claims 

The blend of this brain with chrysanthemum flowers extends one's life(by 500 years) after administering 10 jin (catties, Chinese pound). The longevity claim was made proably due to the reasoning that the long-lived immortals (xianren) were also considered to be capable of flight (like the fengli), according to the commentary by Minakata Kumagusu.

The urine is also said to treat "massive wind" (i.e., leprosy). Certain ailments were believed caused by wind, hence, the wind creature's urine was believed effective.

Its urine is milk-like, and hard to obtain, but can be procured if the beast is raised in a farm.

Jiqu 
The jiqu (Japanese: kikkutsu or kekkutsu) is a beast whose name is tentatively translated as "the one that bows to good fortune"[?].

According to the Youyang zazu it likes to eat a type of aromatic substance called  xunlu xiang, namely "Indian frankincense",

The fengli considered synonymous to jiqu in the BCGM, it is described as feeding on  this frankincense/olibanum, or mastic. It was probably only local rumour that the beast ate this perfumewood resin, according to a scholar in the field perfume ingredients.

A large jiqu weighed 10 catties [≈pounds], and bore resemblance to an otter.  It was almost hairless, with no hair on the head, body, or its for limbs, but a blue (green) stripe of fur ran from its nose, along the spine, down to its tail, about 1 cun [≈inch] wide, with individual hairs about 3 or 4 fen (0.3–0.4 cun).

Identification with actual fauna

Colugo

The fengli in writings was hypothesizes to be a colugo, a bat-like mammal, by Minakata Kumagusu (1920) The colugo's wing is furry on the upper side, unlike the smooth-winged bat.

While the fengli (fūri) is identifiable with the colugo, a flying yōkai called  may be identifiable with the musasabi or the Japanese giant flying squirrel (Petaurista leucogenys), according to some Japanese opinion. Cf. next section on §Giant flying squirrel

Giant flying squirrel

A tentative identification with the red giant flying squirrel has been suggested by Yang Wuquan.

Palm civets

Suzuki's 1931 Japanese translation of the Bencao gangmu (Honzō kōmoku) under this entry indicates its scientific name to be  uncertain, but in the marginal notes mentions ichthyologist 's opinion it may be the musang or the
common Asian palm civet.

A Chinese scholar has also explored the possibility that the masked palm civet (Paguma larvata, Chinese name: 果子狸 guozili)  might be attested as fuli in classical Chinese writings.

Slow lorises

Ignatius Sichelbart who served as court painter for the Qing Emperors painted Fengxing tu (Fig. right) in realistic precise detail, and is considered to have portrayed a slow loris.

The identification of fuli as slow loris actually occurs in B. E. Read's Materia Medica (RMM for short), although he employed the Chinese name of the beast, lan hou, which he literally translated as a "sloth monkey".

The opinion that the fengli belongs to the slow loris genus (懶猴属) Nycticebus is also elocuated in a paper by Tochio (2004), a scholar of natural history.

See also
List of legendary creatures from Japan

Explanatory notes

References 
Citations

Bibliography

. Aozora bunko No.2539

 

Chinese legendary creatures